The 1993 Houston Cougars football team represented the University of Houston during the 1993 NCAA Division I-A football season. The Cougars were led by first-year head coach Kim Helton and played their home games at the Astrodome in Houston, Texas. The team competed as members of the Southwest Conference, finishing tied for last.

Schedule

Source:

References

Houston
Houston Cougars football seasons
Houston Cougars football